Lorena María Vargas Villamil (born 26 August 1986) is a Colombian racing cyclist. She competed in the 2013 UCI women's road race in Florence. She won the Colombian National Road Race Championships in 2012 and 2013.

Major results

Track

2008
 2nd Individual pursuit, National Track Championships
2009
 National Track Championships
1st  Individual pursuit
1st  Omnium
1st  Points race
 2nd  Team pursuit, Pan American Track Championships
2010
 South American Games
1st  Points race
1st  Scratch
1st  Team pursuit
 Pan American Track Championships
2nd  Points race
3rd  Team pursuit
2011
 Pan American Track Championships
2nd  Scratch
3rd  Team pursuit
 3rd  Team pursuit, Pan American Games
 National Track Championships
3rd Individual pursuit
3rd Omnium
2012
 3rd Points race, National Track Championships
2014
 3rd  Team pursuit, Central American and Caribbean Games (with Jessica Parra, Valentina Paniagua and Milena Salcedo)
 3rd Individual pursuit, National Track Championships
2015
 National Track Championships
2nd Points race
3rd Omnium
3rd Scratch
2017
 3rd Individual pursuit, National Track Championships
2018
 2nd Madison, National Track Championships

Road

2008
 National Road Championships
2nd Road race
2nd Time trial
2009
 National Road Championships
2nd Road race
2nd Time trial
2011
 2nd Time trial, National Road Championships
2012
 1st  Road race, National Road Championships
2013
 National Road Championships
1st  Road race
3rd Time trial
 2nd Grand Prix de Oriente
 3rd Overall Vuelta Internacional Femenina a Costa Rica
 6th Grand Prix GSB
 6th Grand Prix el Salvador
2015
 8th Gran Prix San Luis Femenino
2017
 3rd Road race, National Road Championships
2018
 10th Overall Vuelta Femenina a Guatemala
1st Stage 3

References

External links

1986 births
Living people
Colombian female cyclists
Place of birth missing (living people)
Pan American Games medalists in cycling
Pan American Games bronze medalists for Colombia
South American Games gold medalists for Colombia
South American Games medalists in cycling
Cyclists at the 2011 Pan American Games
Competitors at the 2010 South American Games
Medalists at the 2011 Pan American Games
Central American and Caribbean Games bronze medalists for Colombia
Central American and Caribbean Games medalists in cycling
Competitors at the 2014 Central American and Caribbean Games
20th-century Colombian women
21st-century Colombian women